Deep ecology is an environmental philosophy that promotes the inherent worth of all living beings regardless of their instrumental utility to human needs, and the restructuring of modern human societies in accordance with such ideas.

Deep ecology argues that the natural world is a complex of relationships in which the existence of organisms is dependent on the existence of others within ecosystems. It argues that non-vital human interference with or destruction of the natural world poses a threat therefore not only to humans but to all organisms constituting the natural order.

Deep ecology's core principle is the belief that the living environment as a whole should be respected and regarded as having certain basic moral and legal rights to live and flourish, independent of its instrumental benefits for human use. Deep ecology is often framed in terms of the idea of a much broader sociality; it recognizes diverse communities of life on Earth that are composed not only through biotic factors but also, where applicable, through ethical relations, that is, the valuing of other beings as more than just resources. It is described as "deep" because it is regarded as looking more deeply into the reality of humanity's relationship with the natural world, arriving at philosophically more profound conclusions than those of mainstream environmentalism. The movement does not subscribe to anthropocentric environmentalism (which is concerned with conservation of the environment only for exploitation by and for human purposes), since deep ecology is grounded in a different set of philosophical assumptions. Deep ecology takes a holistic view of the world humans live in and seeks to apply to life the understanding that the separate parts of the ecosystem (including humans) function as a whole. The philosophy addresses core principles of different environmental and green movements and advocates a system of environmental ethics advocating wilderness preservation, non-coercive policies encouraging human population decline, and simple living.

Origins
In his original 1973 deep ecology paper, Arne Næss stated that he was inspired by ecologists who were studying the ecosystems throughout the world. Naess also made clear that he felt the real motivation to 'free nature' was spiritual and intuitive. 'Your motivation comes from your total view or your philosophical, religious opinions,' he said, 'so that you feel, when you are working in favour of free nature, you are working for something within your self, that ... demands changes. So you are motivated from what I call ‘deeper premises’.

In a 2014 essay, environmentalist George Sessions identified three people active in the 1960s whom he considered foundational to the movement: author and conservationist Rachel Carson, environmentalist David Brower, and biologist Paul R. Ehrlich. Sessions considers the publication of Carson's 1962 seminal book Silent Spring as the beginning of the contemporary deep ecology movement. Næss also considered Carson the originator of the movement, stating "Eureka, I have found it" upon encountering her writings.

Other events in the 1960s which have been proposed as foundational to the movement are the formation of Greenpeace, and the images of the Earth floating in space taken by the Apollo astronauts.

Principles
Deep ecology proposes an embracing of ecological ideas and environmental ethics (that is, proposals about how humans should relate to nature). It is also a social movement based on a holistic vision of the world. Deep ecologists hold that the survival of any part is dependent upon the well-being of the whole, and criticise the narrative of human supremacy, which they say has not been a feature of most cultures throughout human evolution. Deep ecology presents an eco-centric (earth-centred) view, rather than the anthropocentric (human-centred) view, developed in its most recent form by philosophers of the Enlightenment, such as Newton, Bacon, and Descartes. Proponents of deep ecology oppose the narrative that man is separate from nature, is in charge of nature, or is the steward of nature, or that nature exists as a resource to be freely exploited. They cite the fact that indigenous peoples under-exploited their environment and retained a sustainable society for thousands of years, as evidence that human societies are not necessarily destructive by nature. They believe that the current materialist paradigm must be replaced - as Naess pointed out, this involves more than merely getting rid of capitalism and the concept of economic growth, or 'progress', that is critically endangering the biosphere. 'We need changes in society such that reason and emotion support each other,' he said. '... not only a change in a technological and economic system, but a change that touches all the fundamental aspects of industrial societies. This is what I mean by a change of 'system'. Deep ecologists believe that the damage to natural systems sustained since the industrial revolution now threatens social collapse and possible extinction of humans, and are striving to bring about the kind of ideological, economic and technological changes Naess mentioned. Deep ecology claims that ecosystems can absorb damage only within certain parameters, and contends that civilization endangers the biodiversity of the earth. Deep ecologists have suggested that the human population must be substantially reduced, but advocate a gradual decrease in population rather than any apocalyptic solution In a 1982 interview, Arne Naess commented that a global population of 100 million (0.1 billion) would be desirable. However, others have argued that a population of 1 - 2 billion would be compatible with the deep ecological worldview. Deep ecology eschews traditional left wing-right wing politics, but is viewed as radical ('Deep Green') in its opposition to capitalism, and its advocacy of an ecological paradigm. Unlike conservation, deep ecology does not advocate the controlled preservation of the landbase, but rather 'non-interference' with natural diversity except for vital needs.

In 1985, Bill Devall and George Sessions summed up their understanding of the concept of deep ecology with the following eight points:

The well-being of human and nonhuman life on earth is of intrinsic value irrespective of its value to humans.
The diversity of life-forms is part of this value.
Humans have no right to reduce this diversity except to satisfy vital human needs
The flourishing of human and nonhuman life is compatible with a substantial decrease in human population.
Humans have interfered with nature to a critical level already, and interference is worsening.
Policies must be changed, affecting current economic, technological and ideological structures.
This ideological change should focus on an appreciation of the quality of life rather than adhering to an increasingly high standard of living.
All those who agree with the above tenets have an obligation to implement them.

Development

The phrase "Deep Ecology" first appeared in a 1973 article by the Norwegian philosopher Arne Næss. Næss referred to "biospherical egalitarianism-in principle", which he explained was "an intuitively clear and obvious value axiom. Its restriction to humans is … anthropocentrism with detrimental effects upon the life quality of humans themselves... The attempt to ignore our dependence and to establish a master-slave role has contributed to the alienation of man from himself." Næss added that from a deep ecology point of view "the right of all forms [of life] to live is a universal right which cannot be quantified. No single species of living being has more of this particular right to live and unfold than any other species". As Bron Taylor and Michael Zimmerman have recounted,a key event in the development of deep ecology was the "Rights of Non-Human Nature" conference held at a college in Claremont, California in 1974 [which] drew many of those who would become the intellectual architects of deep ecology.  These included George Sessions who, like Naess, drew on Spinoza's pantheism, later co-authoring Deep Ecology - [Living as if Nature Mattered] with Bill Devall; Gary Snyder, whose remarkable, Pulitzer prize-winning Turtle Island proclaimed the value of place-based spiritualities, indigenous cultures, and animistic perceptions, ideas that would become central within deep ecology subcultures; and Paul Shepard, who in The Tender Carnivore and the Sacred Game, and subsequent works such as Nature and Madness and Coming Home to the Pleistocene, argued that foraging societies were ecologically superior to and emotionally healthier than agricultur[al societies]. Shepard and Snyder especially provided a cosmogony that explained humanity's fall from a pristine, nature paradise.  Also extremely influential was Edward Abbey's Desert Solitaire, which viewed the desert as a sacred place uniquely able to evoke in people a proper, non-anthropocentric understanding of the value of nature.  By the early 1970s the above figures put in place the intellectual foundations of deep ecology.

Sources

Deep ecology is an eco-philosophy derived from intuitive ethical principles. It does not claim to be a science, although it is based generally on the new physics, which, in the early 20th century, undermined the reductionist approach and the notion of objectivity, demonstrating that humans are an integral part of nature; this is a common concept always held by primal peoples. Devall and Sessions, however, note that the work of many ecologists has encouraged the adoption of an "ecological consciousness", quoting environmentalist Aldo Leopold's view that such a consciousness "changes the role of Homo sapiens from conqueror of the land community to plain member and citizen of it." They do not dispute the theory that human cultures can have a benevolent effect on the landbase, only the idea of the control of nature, or human supremacy, which is the central pillar of the industrial paradigm. The tenets of deep ecology state that humans have no right to interfere with natural diversity except for vital needs: the distinction between "vital" and "other needs" cannot be drawn precisely. Deep ecologists reject any mechanical or computer model of nature, and see the earth as a living organism, which should be treated and understood accordingly.

Arne Næss uses Baruch Spinoza as a source, particularly his notion that everything that exists is part of a single reality. Others have copied Næss in this, including Eccy de Jonge and Brenden MacDonald.

Aspects

Environmental education
In 2010, Richard Kahn promoted the movement of ecopedagogy, proposing using radical environmental activism as an educational principle to teach students to support "earth democracy" which promotes the rights of animals, plants, fungi, algae and bacteria. The biologist Dr. Stephan Harding has developed the concept of "holistic science", based on principles of ecology and deep ecology.  In contrast with materialist, reductionist science, holistic science studies natural systems as a living whole. He writes:

Spirituality

Deep ecologist and physicist Frijof Capra has said that '[Deep] ecology and spirituality are fundamentally connected because deep ecological awareness is, ultimately, spiritual awareness.'

Arne Naess commented that he was inspired by the work of Spinoza and Gandhi, both of whom based their values on grounds of religious feeling and experience. Though he regarded deep ecology as a spiritual philosophy, he explained that he was not a 'believer' in the sense of following any particular articles of religious dogma. ' ... it is quite correct to say that I have sometimes been called religious or spiritual, 'he said, 'because I believe that living creatures have an intrinsic worth of their own, and also that there are fundamental intuitions about what is unjust.'.

Næss criticised the Judeo-Christian tradition, stating the Bible's "arrogance of stewardship consists in the idea of superiority which underlies the thought that we exist to watch over nature like a highly respected middleman between the Creator and Creation". Næss further criticizes the reformation's view of creation as property to be put into maximum productive use.

However, Naess added that while he felt the word 'God' was 'too loaded with preconceived ideas', he accepted Spinoza's idea of God as 'immanent' - 'a single creative force'... 'constantly creating the world by being the creative force in Nature'. He did not, he said, 'exclude the possibility that Christian theological principles are true in a certain sense ...'.

Joanna Macy in "the Work that Reconnects" integrates Buddhist philosophy with a deep ecological viewpoint.

Criticisms

Eurocentric bias
Guha and Martinez-Allier critique the four defining characteristics of deep ecology. First, because deep ecologists believe that environmental movements must shift from an anthropocentric to an ecocentric approach, they fail to recognize the two most fundamental ecological crises facing the world: overconsumption in the global north and increasing militarization. Second, deep ecology's emphasis on wilderness provides impetus for the imperialist yearning of the West. Third, deep ecology appropriates Eastern traditions, characterizes Eastern spiritual beliefs as monolithic, and denies agency to Eastern peoples. And fourth, because deep ecology equates environmental protection with wilderness preservation its radical elements are confined within the American wilderness preservationist movement. 

While deep ecologists accept that overconsumption and militarization are major issues, they point out that the impulse to save wilderness is intuitive and has no connection with imperialism. This claim by Guha and Martinez-Allier, in particular, closely resembles statements made, for instance, by Brazilian president Jair Bolsonaro declaring Brazil's right to cut down the Amazon Rainforest. 'The Amazon belongs to Brazil and European countries can mind their own business because they have already destroyed their own environment.'

With regard to 'appropriating spiritual beliefs' Arne Naess pointed out that the essence of deep ecology is the belief that 'all living creatures have their own intrinsic value, a value irrespective of the use they might have for mankind.' Naess stated that supporters of the deep ecology movement came from various different religious and spiritual traditions, and were united in this one belief, albeit basing it on various different values.

Knowledge of nonhuman interests
Animal rights activists state that for an entity to require intrinsic rights, it must have interests. Deep ecologists are criticised for insisting they can somehow understand the thoughts and interests of non-humans such as plants or protists, which they claim thus proves that non-human lifeforms have intelligence. For example, a single-celled bacteria might move towards a certain chemical stimulation, although such movement might be rationally explained, a deep ecologist might say that this was all invalid because according to his better understanding of the situation that the intention formulated by this particular bacteria was informed by its deep desire to succeed in life. One criticism of this belief is that the interests that a deep ecologist attributes to non-human organisms such as survival, reproduction, growth, and prosperity are really human interests. Deep ecologists refute this criticism by pointing out first that 'survival' 'reproduction' 'growth' and 'prosperity'(flourishing) are accepted attributes of all living organisms: 'to succeed in life', depending on how one defines 'success' could certainly be construed as the aim of all life. In addition, the plethora of recent work on mimesis. Thomas Nagel suggests, "[B]lind people are able to detect objects near them by a form of a sonar, using vocal clicks or taps of a cane. Perhaps if one knew what that was like, one could by extension imagine roughly what it was like to possess the much more refined sonar of a bat." Others such as David Abram have pointed out that consciousness is not specific to humans, but a property of the totality of the universe of which humans are a manifestation.

Deepness
When Arne Næss coined the term deep ecology, he compared it favourably with shallow ecology which he criticized for its utilitarian and anthropocentric attitude to nature and for its materialist and consumer-oriented outlook, describing its "central objective" as "the health and affluence of people in the developed countries." William D. Grey believes that developing a non-anthropocentric set of values is "a hopeless quest". He seeks an improved "shallow" view. Deep ecologists point out, however, that "shallow ecology" (resource management conservation) is counter-productive, since it serves mainly to support capitalism, the means through which industrial civilization destroys the biosphere. The eco-centric view thus only becomes 'hopeless' within the structures and ideology of civilization. Outside it, however, a non-anthropocentric world view has characterised most 'primal' cultures since time immemorial, and, in fact, obtained in many indigenous groups until the industrial revolution and after. Some cultures still hold this view today. As such, the eco-centric narrative is in not alien to humans, and may be seen as the normative ethos in human evolution. Grey's view represents the reformist discourse that deep ecology has rejected from the beginning.

Misanthropy
Social ecologist Murray Bookchin interpreted deep ecology as being misanthropic, due in part to the characterization of humanity by David Foreman, of the environmental advocacy group Earth First!, as a "pathological infestation on the Earth".  Bookchin mentions that some, like Foreman, defend misanthropic measures such as organising the rapid genocide of most of humanity. In response, deep ecologists have argued that Foreman's statement clashes with the core narrative of deep ecology, the first tenet of which stresses the intrinsic value of both nonhuman and human life. Arne Naess suggested a slow decrease in human population over an extended period, not genocide. 

Bookchin's second major criticism is that deep ecology fails to link environmental crises with authoritarianism and hierarchy. He suggests that deep ecologists fail to recognise the potential for humans to solve environmental issues. In response, deep ecologists have argued that industrial civilization, with its class hierarchy, is the sole source of the ecological crisis. The eco-centric worldview precludes any acceptance of social class or authority based on social status. Deep ecologists believe that since ecological problems are created by industrial civilization the only solution is the deconstruction of the culture itself.

Sciencism
Daniel Botkin concludes that although deep ecology challenges the assumptions of western philosophy, and should be taken seriously, it derives from a misunderstanding of scientific information and conclusions based on this misunderstanding, which are in turn used as justification for its ideology. It begins with an ideology and is political and social in focus. Botkin has also criticized Næss's assertion that all species are morally equal and his disparaging description of pioneering species.  Deep ecologists counter this criticism by asserting that a concern with political and social values is primary, since the destruction of natural diversity stems directly from the social structure of civilization, and cannot be halted by reforms within the system. They also cite the work of environmentalists and activists such as Rachel Carson, Aldo Leopold, John Livingston, and others as being influential, and are occasionally critical of the way the science of ecology has been misused.

Utopianism
Eco-critic Jonathan Bate has called deep ecologists 'utopians', pointing out that 'utopia' actually means 'nowhere' and quoting Rousseau's claim that "the state of nature no longer exists and perhaps never did and probably never will."  Bate asks how a planet crowded with cities

Bates' criticism rests partly on the idea that industrial civilization and the technics it depends on are themselves 'natural' because they are made by humans. Deep ecologists have indicated that the concept of technics being 'natural' and therefore 'morally neutral' is a delusion of industrial civilization: there can be nothing 'neutral' about nuclear weapons, for instance, whose sole purpose is large scale destruction. Historian Lewis Mumford,  divides technology into 'democratic' and 'authoritarian' technics ('technics' includes both technical and cultural aspects of technology).  While 'democratic' technics, available to small communities, may be neutral, 'authoritarian' technics, available only to large-scale, hierarchical, authoritarian, societies, are not. Such technics are not only unsustainable, but 'are driving planetary murder'. They need urgently to be abandoned, as supported by point #6 of the deep ecology platform.

With reference to the degree to which landscapes are natural, Peter Wohlleben draws a temporal line (roughly equivalent to the development of Mumford's'authoritarian' technics) at the agricultural revolution, about 8000 BC, when "selective farming practices began to change species." This is also the time when the landscape began to be intentionally transformed into an ecosystem completely devoted to meeting human needs.

Concerning Hobbes's pronouncement on 'the state of nature', deep ecologists and others have commented that it is false and was made simply to legitimize the idea of a putative 'social contract' by which some humans are subordinate to others. There is no evidence that members of primal societies, employing 'democratic technics', lived shorter lives than those in civilization (at least before the 20th century); their lives were the opposite of solitary, since they lived in close-knit communities, and while 'poverty' is a social relation non-existent in sharing cultures, 'ignorant' and 'brutish' both equate to the term 'savage' used by colonials of primal peoples, referring to the absence of authoritarian technics in their cultures. Justice, political liberty and altruism are characteristic of egalitarian primal societies rather than civilization, which is defined by class hierarchies and is therefore by definition unjust, immoral, and lacking in altruism.

Links with other philosophies

Arne Naess stated that the main philosophical influence on his life and work was Spinoza. 'When I was seventeen I read Spinoza's 'Ethics' he said, '... I was inspired by [his] view of human nature or essence: our nature or essence is such that we are pleased at other's pleasure and feel sad about other's sadness. Kindness and love activate our nature; best of all, they activate all aspects of ourselves.'

Peter Singer critiques anthropocentrism and advocates for animals to be given rights. However, Singer has disagreed with deep ecology's belief in the intrinsic value of nature separate from questions of suffering. Zimmerman groups deep ecology with feminism and civil rights movements. Nelson contrasts it with ecofeminism. The links with animal rights are perhaps the strongest, as "proponents of such ideas argue that 'all life has intrinsic value'".

David Foreman, the co-founder of the radical direct-action movement Earth First!, has said he is an advocate for deep ecology. At one point Arne Næss also engaged in direct action when he chained himself to rocks in front of Mardalsfossen, a waterfall in a Norwegian fjord, in a successful protest against the building of a dam.

Some have linked the movement to green anarchism as evidenced in a compilation of essays titled Deep Ecology & Anarchism.

The object-oriented ontologist Timothy Morton has explored similar ideas in the books Ecology without Nature: Rethinking Environmental Aesthetics (2009) and Dark Ecology: For a Logic of Future Coexistence (2016).

Notable advocates of deep ecology

 David Abram
 Michael Asher
 Thomas Berry
 Wendell Berry
 Leonardo Boff
 Fritjof Capra
 Michael Dowd
 Charles Eisenstein
 Vivienne Elanta
 David Foreman
 Warwick Fox
 Chellis Glendinning
 Edward Goldsmith
 John Michael Greer
 Félix Guattari
 Paul Hawken
 Martin Heidegger
 Julia Butterfly Hill
 Derrick Jensen
 Lierre Keith
 Paul Kingsnorth
 Bernie Krause
 Satish Kumar
 Dolores LaChapelle
 Gilbert LaFreniere
 Pentti Linkola
 Joanna Macy
 Jerry Mander
 Freya Mathews
 W. S. Merwin
 Sergio Rossetti Morosini
 Peter Newman
 Helena Norberg-Hodge
 David Orton
 Val Plumwood
 Theodore Roszak
 Elena Sharoykina
 Paul Shepard
 Gary Snyder
 Timothy Sprigge
 Richard Sylvan
 Douglas Tompkins
 Robin Wall Kimmerer
 Oberon Zell-Ravenheart
 John Zerzan

See also

 Biocentrism (ethics)
 Biophilia hypothesis
 Biotic ethics
 Coupled human-environment system
 Earth liberation
 Ecocentrism
 Ecofascism
 Ecological civilization
 Ecosocialism
 Ecosophy
 Gaianism
 Intrinsic value (animal ethics)
 Negative population growth
 OpenAirPhilosophy
 Voluntary human extinction movement
 Hierarchy theory
 Scale (analytical tool)

References

Additional sources
 Bender, F. L. 2003. The Culture of Extinction: Toward a Philosophy of Deep Ecology Amherst, New York: Humanity Books.
 Katz, E., A. Light, et al. 2000. Beneath the Surface: Critical Essays in the Philosophy of Deep Ecology Cambridge, Mass.: MIT Press.
 LaChapelle, D. 1992. Sacred Land, Sacred Sex:  Rapture of the Deep Durango: Kivakí Press.
 Passmore, J. 1974. Man's Responsibility for Nature London: Duckworth.
 
 
 Drengson, Alan. "The Deep Ecology Movement." The Green Majority, CIUT 89.5 FM, University of Toronto, 6 June 2008.

Further reading
 
Glasser, Harold (ed.) 2005. The Selected Works of Arne Næss, Volumes 1-10. Springer, . (review)
 
Keulartz, Jozef 1998. Struggle for nature : a critique of radical ecology, London [etc.] : Routledge.
Linkola, Pentti 2011. Can Life Prevail? UK: Arktos Media, 2nd Revised ed. 
 Marc R., Fellenz. "9. Ecophilosophy: Deep Ecology And Ecofeminism." The Moral Menagerie : Philosophy and Animal Rights. 158. Champaign: University of Illinois Press, 2007.
 

Tobias, Michael (ed.) 1988 (1984). Deep Ecology. Avant Books.  .

 
Environmental ethics
Spinoza studies
Anti-capitalism
Political ecology
Arne Næss